Jocelyn Angloma (born 7 August 1965) is a football manager and former professional player who played as a defender. Born in Guadeloupe, he represented both the France and Guadeloupe national teams. He is the head coach of the Guadeloupe national team.

Club career
Angloma began his professional football career in France, and was a member of the Marseille team which won the 1992–93 UEFA Champions League. He played more than 400 games in European first divisions, including spells in Italy, and 120 appearances with Valencia in Spain, where he played until his retirement in 2002. He played in the UEFA Champions League Finals of 2000 and 2001 for the Spanish club, but was on the losing side on both occasions.

International career

France
Angloma played 37 times for France between 1990 and 1996, scoring one goal. Angloma was part of the squad at Euro 92 and Euro 96.

Comeback with Guadeloupe
In 2006, Angloma came out of retirement to play for his native région, Guadeloupe, and help them qualify for the 2007 Caribbean Nations Cup. He was allowed to represent Guadeloupe because Guadeloupe is not a FIFA member and only participates in regional competitions. After his return from retirement, Angloma moved from his natural position as a right-back and played as a midfield playmaker for Guadeloupe.

In December 2017, he was appointed Guadeloupe's coach.

Personal life
Jocelyn Angloma's son Johan plays in several youth teams of Guadeloupe and was member of the Guadeloupe under-14 national football team at the Coupe National Under-14 2008.

Career statistics
Scores and results list France's and Guadeloupe's goal tally first, score column indicates score after each Angloma goal.

Managerial statistics

Honours
Marseille
Division 1: 1991–92
UEFA Champions League: 1992–93

Inter Milan
UEFA Cup runner-up: 1996–97

Valencia
La Liga: 2001–02
Copa del Rey: 1998–99
Supercopa de España: 1999
UEFA Champions League runner-up: 1999–2000, 2000–01
UEFA Intertoto Cup: 1998

France U21
UEFA European Under-21 Championship: 1988

Individual
UEFA European Championship Team of the Tournament: 1992
ESM Team of the Year: 1996–97, 1999–2000, 2000–01
 CONCACAF Gold Cup All-Tournament team (Honorable Mention): 2007

References

1965 births
Living people
Guadeloupean footballers
Guadeloupe international footballers
French footballers
France international footballers
France under-21 international footballers
Association football defenders
UEFA Euro 1992 players
UEFA Euro 1996 players
2007 CONCACAF Gold Cup players
Dual internationalists (football)
Stade Rennais F.C. players
Lille OSC players
Paris Saint-Germain F.C. players
Olympique de Marseille players
Torino F.C. players
Inter Milan players
Valencia CF players
Serie A players
La Liga players
Ligue 1 players
UEFA Champions League winning players
Black French sportspeople
French expatriate footballers
Expatriate footballers in Italy
Expatriate footballers in Spain
French expatriate sportspeople in Italy
French expatriate sportspeople in Spain
Guadeloupean expatriate sportspeople in Italy
Guadeloupean expatriate sportspeople in Spain
French people of Guadeloupean descent
2021 CONCACAF Gold Cup managers